Jane Peterson (1876–1965) was a graduate of Pratt Institute and an American Impressionist and Expressionist painter. Her works are created in Impressionist and Expressionist styles using broad swaths of vibrant colors to combine an interest in light and in depiction of spontaneous moments and are well known for vivid, rich painted still life, beach scenes along the Massachusetts coast. Her works are housed in museums such as the Metropolitan Museum of Art, the Museum of the City of New York, the National Museum of Women in the Arts and Hirshhorn Museum in Washington D.C, and Pennsylvania Academy of Fine Arts and Philadelphia Museum of Arts in Philadelphia, Pennsylvania.

Biography

Early life

Peterson was born in Elgin, Illinois, on November 28, 1876, as the daughter of an Elgin Watch Company employee and a homemaker. Though she was born as Jennie Christine she changed her name to Jane right after she graduated from high school, in 1894. She didn't receive any formal art training as a child, but knew intuitively how to paint everything she saw. As a child she attended public school. Later, at the 1893 Columbian Exposition in Chicago, she learned about the Pratt Institute, a fairly new technical school in Brooklyn, New York and took an art aptitude test. After she applied to Pratt, in 1895, she was accepted in the art department and Peterson borrowed $300 from her mother to study there. In 1901 she graduated and went on to study oil and watercolor painting at the Art Students League in New York City with Frank DuMond.

Study in Europe 
Like many young artists of her time, Jane took several grand tours of the European continents and studied under several famous European artists. She studied with the Welsh artist Frank Brangwyn in Venice and London, Joaquin Sorolla in Madrid, and painter Jacques Blanche and sculptor Andre L’Hote in Paris. Under their guidance she gained a diverse and expert knowledge of painting techniques and composition. While in Paris, Peterson also became friends with American writer Gertrude and art collector and critic Leo Stein, becoming a regular at the siblings' various gatherings where the guests included Pablo Picasso and Henri Matisse. She lived in rooms in Montparnasse located around the corner from Gertrude Stein’s salon, where on Saturday evening artists and art enthusiasts would gather to view and discuss Stein's seminal collection of modern art. During her time in Paris, Peterson was surrounded by Fauvism, Expressionism, Impressionism, and the beginnings of Cubism. When she first arrived in Paris in 1907 Picasso was already paving the way with innovative and experimental techniques, displaying Fauvist tendencies and going beyond them.

A solo exhibition of Peterson's work held in 1908 at the Société des Artistes Français won much acclaim among Parisian critics and resulted in one viewer's setting up an exhibition at the St. Botolph club in Boston the next year of her earlier works.

Influence of Sorolla 
One year after Peterson returned to Chicago, she went back to Europe and studied under  Joaquín Sorolla y Bastida in Madrid. Of all her mentors, Sorolla had the most influence upon Peterson's style. After 1909, Peterson's canvases become more daring with color, as layers of loose brushstrokes combine to represent the shimmer of Summer's light in southern Europe.

Peterson was following Sorolla for many aspects. After Sorolla held exhibition at the Art Institute of Chicago, Peterson's works exhibited in 1910 for her trip to North Africa. Also it was Sorolla that persuaded Peterson to follow him to New York where he had been commissioned to do a portrait of Louis Comfort Tiffany, the founder of the Tiffany&Co. At Tiffany's invitation, Peterson joined the artistic circle at Laurelton, his summer estate in Oyster Bay, Long Island.

Solo Trip to Egypt 
In 1910, Peterson travelled alone to Egypt and Algiers in North Africa – an extremely bold act for a woman in the early 20th century.

Artistic Style 
Peterson's work is hard to put into one or two single category of art. Actually, her works are more like a blend of several most prominent styles in the turn of the 20th century under the influence of her academic artistic training of many influences in both America and across Europe: Impressionism, Neo- and Post-Impressionism, Art Nouveau, Nabi, and Fauvism. Peterson love to use loose brushwork and bold colors in her paintings.  From 1910 through 1916 Peterson became increasingly linked stylistically to fellow American, Maurice Prendergast. They shared similar interests in subject matter, and both had traveled and studied in Europe. Peterson and Prendergast had comparable technical skills of astute observation and loved colorful subjects but Peterson's linear movement is more aggressively flowing than Prendergast's. Gradually, they each developed a unique style, according to Charlotte Streiffer Rubenstein.3

Interest in Watercolor 
In 1912, Peterson went back to Paris, where she associated with the members of the American Art Association which included American Impressionist Painter Frederick Carl Frieseke. Her interest in watercolor started at this time, and, on her return to the United States in 1913, she began a six-year tenure at the Art Students League in New York as an instructor of watercolor painting.

Friendship with Tiffany 
Jane Peterson formed a good bond with her patron and friend, Louis Comfort Tiffany, American stained glass and jewelry designer and the head of the famous firm Tiffany Studios. Their many trips together inspired Peterson's works: In 1916, Peterson joined Tiffany in a painting adventure and expedition to Alaska and the Canadian Northwest.

Undomestic Female Painter 
As a result of her adventures around the globe, Peterson painted people, events and scenery that are of importance around the globe when many women favored painting domestic scenes. For example, during World War One, Peterson joined the war effort painting military portraits and patriotic scenes of women rolling bandages and folding blankets at the Red Cross Center. Spending six months in Turkey in 1924, she painted streets scenes in the Islamic cities of Constantinople and Broosa.

Marriage
Peterson married a corporate lawyer, M. Bernard Philipp, when she was fifty years old. Four years after her husband's death, she married a New Haven physician James S. McCarty in 1939. Their marriage lasted for less than a year.

Death
During her lifetime, Peterson was featured in more than 80 one-woman exhibitions before her death on August 14, 1965.

Career

Peterson taught in Elmira, New York, as a drawing supervisor of public school teachers in Boston, Massachusetts, and the Maryland Institute in Baltimore for three years. In 1907, she extended her artistic career by taking a grand tour in Europe, visiting England, Holland, France and Italy, which was the best way for her to learn from the masters as a young artist. Peterson gained expert knowledge for painting techniques and composition from Frank Brangwyn in Venice and London, Joaquin Sorolla in Madrid, and Jacques Blanche and Andre L' Hote in Paris. She was living during the time of Fauvism, Expressionism, Impressionism, and at the beginning of Cubism.

Peterson started to exhibit her works in 1908 at the Societe des Artistes Francais in Paris, France. She exhibited at the St. Botolph Club in Boston, Massachusetts, the Knoedler Gallery in New York City, and at the Bendann's Art Gallery in Baltimore, Maryland. From 1910 to 1914 Peterson had her own exhibitions at the Art Institute of Chicago, Illinois. She also participated in many group shows such as the American Watercolor Society and the New York Society of Painters both in New York City and the Baltimore Watercolor Club in Maryland.

In 1912 Peterson started teaching watercolor at the Art Students League and became the Drawing Supervisor of the Brooklyn Public Schools. In 1916 she joined  Louis Comfort Tiffany for a transcontinental painting exhibition in his private railway car. Peterson traveled widely, painting from Maine to Florida and as far north as British Columbia. 
Her 1930’s oil painting “Florida Mangroves” is in the permanent collection of the Norton Museum of Art in West Palm Beach, Florida. 

She annually visited Europe and spent six months in Turkey in 1924.

Works

Two of Peterson's famous works are held by the Metropolitan Museum of Art. Parade was created with gouache, watercolor, charcoal, and graphite on paper, and Turkish Fountain with Garden (from Louis C. Tiffany Estate, Oyster Bay) created with oil and charcoal on canvas, in 1910. Marché aux Fleurs, oil on canvas, painted while in Paris in 1908, is held in the Terra Foundation Collection. The Floats was appraised on PBS' Antiques Roadshow in October 2014. She was selected as the most outstanding individual of the year for her artistic achievement by the American Historical Society in 1938. During World War II she produced four portraits representing women in each branch of the military. These portraits were auctioned for $211,000 to build a war memorial. Her works were featured in Jane Peterson: At Home and Abroad, shown in 2018 at the Columbia Museum of Art, the Mattatuck Museum, the Long Island Museum of Art, and the Hyde Collection (Glens Falls New York).

References

Further reading 
 Joseph, J. Jonathan, Jobe Pierce, Patricia. Jane Peterson, an American artist, J. J. Joseph, Boston, 1981.
Tellier, Cassandra L, James M. Keny, and Tara Keny. The French Connection: Midwestern Modernist Women, 1900-1930. Columbus, Ohio: The Schumacher Gallery, Capital University: In association with Keny Galleries, 2014
 Foster, Kathleen A. American Watercolor in the Age of Homer and Sargent. New Haven: Yale University Press, 2017.

External links
Artwork by Jane Peterson

1876 births
1965 deaths
People from Elgin, Illinois
American women painters
Expressionist painters
American Impressionist painters
20th-century American women artists
20th-century American painters
Painters from Illinois
Pratt Institute alumni
Art Students League of New York alumni